Bidia Dandaron (Vidyadhara) (December 28, 1914, Soorkhoi, Kizhinga, Buryatia — October 26, 1974, Vydrino, Buryatia) was a major Buddhist author and teacher in the USSR. He also worked in academic Tibetology, contributed to the Tibetan-Russian Dictionary (1959) and made several translations from Tibetan into Russian. He is mostly remembered as a Buddhist teacher whose students in Russia, Estonia, Latvia, and Lithuania continued both religious and scholarly work, and as an early Buddhist author who wrote on European philosophy, history, and science within a Buddhist framework. Among his students were Alexander Piatigorsky and Linnart Mäll.

Biography 
Born to a Buryat Buddhist tantric practitioner named Dorji Badmaev, Bidia studied both secular and Buddhist subjects from an early age. Then, he was recognized as the tulku of Gyayag Rinpoche (Wilie: rGya yag rin po che), a Buddhist master of Gelug tradition from Kumbum Monastery, who visited Buryatia several times and died not long before Bidia was born. Gyayag Rinpoche's tulku lineage starts from Vimalakirti.

However the Buryat lamas under Tsydenov did not submit the boy to the Tibetan search party that had recognized Dandaron as a tulku, on the pretext of Buryat lamas being capable to educate, and being in need of, their own religious leader. Tibetans then returned to Kumbum and chose a local boy (Blo-bzang bstan-pa’i rgyal-mtshan, 1916–1990).

In 1921, Buryat religious and secular leader Lubsan-Sandan Tsydenov proclaimed Dandaron heir to his throne of Dharmaraja.

In 1934—1937 Dandaron studied in the Aircraft Device Construction Institute in Leningrad, and attended the Eastern Faculty of Leningrad State University as an auditor, studying Tibetan language with Andrey Vostrikov.

As religion was suppressed by the Soviets, Dandaron was brought to court three times and spent a significant part of his life in prison camps. First, he was arrested in 1937 and released in 1943, then arrested again in 1948 but released with political rehabilitation in 1956. He actively wrote and taught on Buddhism while imprisoned, and some of his ardent followers started from camps. There, he also had a number of Russian philosophers and other scholars, as well as Buryat lamas, to exchange opinions and gain knowledge of European philosophy and history he widely refers to in his writings. Principally, Vasily Seseman, a philosophy professor from Lithuania who was imprisoned from 1950 to 1956, became his friend and tutor in European philosophy, starting Danrdaron's appreciation of Kantian thought.

After 1956 his friends from the Oriental Studies Institute in Leningrad made attempts to give him a job in the institute library, but were not allowed to. In 1957, Dandaron began working for the Buryat Institute of Social Sciences in Ulan-Ude. He wrote extensively on Tibetan studies and translated religious and historical literature of Tibet into Russian, publishing over 30 articles and other works. His religious works came to public as samizdat.

In 1960 - early 1970s the community of his followers grew to several dozen people, mostly from St Petersburg, Moscow, Tartu and Vilnius. His principal community was in St Petersburg (then Leningrad) where in 1972 he was arrested and tried for the organization of a Buddhist sect. Some of his students were arrested as well, but never tried. Mostly they were released, while some were placed in mental health clinic. Dandaron got 5 years of labor camp where he continued to write about, teach and practice Buddhism. Having warned his neighbors, in the camp in Vydrino he experienced samadhi several times, stopping his heartbeat and breath at will for days. In 1974 he did not return from the samadhi.

Sources 
 Dandaron, Bidia Dandarovich, an entry in: The modern encyclopedia of Russian and Soviet history, Volume 7. Bruce F. Adams (Ed.), Academic International Press, 2006,  pages 177-179
 Dandaron, Bidija Dandaronovič, an entry in: Biographical dictionary of dissidents in the Soviet Union, 1956-1975. By S. P. de Boer, E. J. Driessen, H. L. Verhaar, Universiteit van Amsterdam. Oost-Europa Instituut. S. P. de Boer (ed.). BRILL, 1982. , 
 Stephen Batchelor. The awakening of the west: the encounter of Buddhism and Western culture. Parallax Press, 1994. ,  pages 283-
 John Snelling. Buddhism in Russia. Element, 1993. ,  pages 260-264
 A Chronicle of human rights in the USSR., issues 7–12, Khronika Press., 1974 (page 52 Dandaron Necrology)
 Mikhail Nemtsev Bidia Dandaron (1914–1974) an entry in: Filosofia: An Encyclopedia of Russian Thought.

1914 births
1974 deaths
Tibetan Buddhists from the Soviet Union
Tibetan Buddhism writers
Tibetologists
Buryat people
Tibetan–Russian translators
Buddhist translators
Soviet translators
Prisoners and detainees of the Soviet Union
Prisoners who died in Soviet detention
20th-century translators